Eupithecia nahuelbuta is a moth in the family Geometridae. It is found in the region of Araucania (the Province of Malleco) in Chile. The habitat consists of the Northern Valdivian Forest Biotic Province.

The length of the forewings is about 9 mm. The forewings are covered with mixture of greyish white, dark brown, brownish black, and reddish brown scales. The hindwings are greyish white, with scattered greyish brown and dark brown scales. Adults have been recorded on wing in February.

Etymology
The specific name is based on the type locality.

References

Moths described in 1987
nahuelbuta
Moths of South America
Endemic fauna of Chile